Uttej is an Indian actor and screenwriter who works in Telugu films. He won the Nandi Award for Best Male Comedian for the film Chandamama (2007).

Personal life
Uttej was born and brought up in Nalgonda district. He is the nephew of noted lyricist Suddala Ashok Teja. Uttej married Padmavathi who died in September 2021 due to cancer.

Career 
Uttej started his career as an assistant director in Ram Gopal Varma's directorial debut Siva in 1989. He also played the role of canteen waiter in the film. He recommended JD Chakravathi to play antagonist role in Siva. He acted along with many lead actors and also worked as assistant director to Krishna Vamsi for the film Gulabi.

Filmography

Actor

Writer 
Raatri (1992)
Money Money (1995)
Ninne Pelladata (1996; additional dialogue)
Khadgam (2002)
Rakhi (2006; additional dialogue)
Mahatma (2009; additional dialogue)
Power (2014; additional dialogue)
Bengal Tiger (2015; additional dialogue)

Dubbing artist
Vennela Kishore - Vennela
Vadivelu - Pogaru
N. Santhanam -  Nene Ambani

References

Living people
Male actors from Hyderabad, India
Telugu comedians
Year of birth missing (living people)